Cima Viola is a mountain of Lombardy, Italy.

See also
 List of mountains of the Alps

References

External links

Cima Viola on Hikr

Mountains of the Alps
Alpine three-thousanders
Mountains of Lombardy